Jung Key (Hangul: 정키, born October 10, 1986), is a South Korean composer. He released his first album, Emotion, on May 29, 2014.

Discography

Studio albums

Singles

Other charted songs

Filmography

Television shows

Awards and nominations

Gaon Chart Music Awards

References

1986 births
Living people
South Korean composers